Matti Johan Hamberg (born 26 April 1932) is a Finnish former speed skater who competed in the 1956 Winter Olympics.

He was born in Helsinki.

In 1956 he finished ninth in the 500 metres event, 18th in the 1500 metres competition, and 32nd in the 5000 metres contest.

External links
 
 profile

1932 births
Possibly living people
Finnish male speed skaters
Olympic speed skaters of Finland
Speed skaters at the 1956 Winter Olympics
Sportspeople from Helsinki